Chimalpilli I was a tlatoani (ruler) of the Aztec altepetl (city-state) of Ecatepec from 1428 until his death in 1465. He was the first known historical king of that city.

He was also known as Huehue Chimalpilli.

There was also Chimalpilli II.

Biography
Chimalpilli was a son of Chichimecacihuatzin II. Her father was an Aztec emperor Moctezuma I and her mother was queen Chichimecacihuatzin I.

His father was Huehue Huanitzin, a "great leader" of Itztapalapan.

His successor was Tezozomoc, son of Emperor Chimalpopoca.

Family tree
Chimalpilli had a son called Matlaccoatzin, and he is sometimes called a king.

References

Tlatoque of Ecatepec
Nahua nobility
Year of birth unknown
1465 deaths
15th-century monarchs in North America
15th-century indigenous people of the Americas
15th century in the Aztec civilization
Nobility of the Americas